Jed Roberts (born November 10, 1967) was a Canadian Football League defensive end and linebacker who played thirteen seasons for the Edmonton Eskimos. His father was Jay Roberts, a former tight end with the Ottawa Rough Riders.

External links
 
 "5th Quarter - Jed Roberts" Esks.com video vignette
  

1967 births
Living people
Canadian football people from Ottawa
Canadian football defensive linemen
Edmonton Elks players
Native American sportspeople
Northern Colorado Bears football players
Players of Canadian football from Ontario